A split intersection is a rarely built at-grade variant of the diamond interchange. On the crossroad, the four leg intersection is being replaced by two intersections. The beginning one-way traffic at the fourth leg makes the intersections reduce the number of conflicts similar to a three leg T-intersection to improve traffic flow.

Existing examples
 At Legacy Drive and Preston Road, Plano, Texas, with Texas U-turn lanes, 
 At New Dallas Highway (US-77) and E. Industrial Boulevard TX-340 in Lacy Lakeview, Texas, 
 At Stock Road and Winterfold Road in Perth, Australia
 It is the most common intersection design on Utah State Route 85, also called Mountain View Corridor. They are planned to be later converted, mostly into diamond interchanges, by adding a bridge in the middle.
 At Sarcee Trail and Richmond Road, Calgary, Alberta, Canada, 
 Four intersections along Terwillegar Drive in Edmonton, Alberta, Canada
Four intersections along Manning Drive in Edmonton, Alberta, Canada
 Lake Woodlands Drive at Grogans Mill Road in The Woodlands, Texas;

Town center intersection

A town center intersection (TCI) is similar to a split intersection; however, both the arterial road and the crossroad are split into separated one-way streets. The resulting grid, most often implemented in a city, reduces conflicts to two directions per intersection.

The TCI's grade-separated variant is the three-level diamond interchange.

Examples

 Grogans Mill Road at Research Forest Drive in The Woodlands, Texas; 
 Springwoods Village Parkway at Holzwarth Road in Spring, Texas; 
 San Elijo Road at Elfin Forest Road in San Marcos, California; 
170 Street and Stony Plain Road and 100 Ave in Edmonton, Alberta.

See also
 Offset T-intersection
 Hamburger intersection (Throughabout)

References

Further reading
 Simulation of the Split Intersection, ATTAP, University of Maryland, 11 November 2015

External links
Animation of a town center intersection

Road junction types